The Conyngham-Hacker House (aka the Old Fisher House) is a historic house in the Germantown section of Philadelphia, Pennsylvania. The 2½-story stone house was built in 1755 by William Forbes.  It was known successively as the Conyngham, Wister, and Hacker House. The building served as a boarding school and as the headquarters of the Germantown Historical Society.

The Conyngham-Hacker House was added to the National Register of Historic Places in 1972. It is a contributing property of the Colonial Germantown Historic District.

References

External links
Listing and photograph at the Historic American Buildings Survey
Listing at Philadelphia Architects and Buildings

Houses on the National Register of Historic Places in Philadelphia
Houses completed in 1755
Historic district contributing properties in Pennsylvania
Germantown, Philadelphia